Lights Out is an American television boxing drama series from the FX network in the United States. It stars Holt McCallany as Patrick "Lights" Leary, a New Jersey native, and former heavyweight champion boxer who is considering a comeback. The series premiered on January 11, 2011 at 10 p.m. ET/PT. On March 24, 2011, FX announced the cancellation of the show. The final episode aired on April 5.

Plot synopsis
An aging, former world heavyweight champion, Patrick "Lights" Leary is an extremely proud, good-hearted Irish American who is struggling to find his identity after retiring from his beloved boxing. After years of wear and tear in the ring, he is diagnosed with pugilistic dementia (a neurological disorder that affects boxers who suffered too many hits to the head, gradually causing memory loss and constant headaches). Now, Lights is struggling to support his family (a wife and three daughters) and their comfortably secure lifestyle in Bayonne, New Jersey, after his amoral and incompetent brother/business manager squanders Lights' life savings.  Running out of ways—and time—to earn enough money to re-secure his family's future, Leary must decide whether to either: accept the brutal and demeaning job of debt collector for a local racketeer; or, launch a long shot, health-risking, comeback for the huge payday that would result from becoming "the champ" once again.

Cast
Holt McCallany as Patrick "Lights" Leary
Pablo Schreiber as Johnny Leary
Catherine McCormack as Theresa Leary
Stacy Keach as Robert "Pops" Leary
Meredith Hagner as Ava Leary
Ryann Shane as Daniella Leary
Lily Pilblad as Katherine Leary
Billy Brown as Richard "Death Row" Reynolds
Elizabeth Marvel as Margaret Leary
Bill Irwin as Hal Brennan
Reg E. Cathey as Barry K. Word
Eamonn Walker as Ed Romeo

Episodes

Reception
Lights Out has received positive reviews from television critics. Review aggregate Metacritic awarded the series a score of 79%, based on 25 reviews, indicating "Generally favorable reviews". Matt Roush from TV Guide said "Lights Out delivers a sucker punch of downbeat realism as Leary takes a pounding from life but refuses to give up. McCallany brings such a weary dignity to the role you can't help but root for him." He went on to say "Lights Out has its work cut out for it to find and hold an audience and deliver the proverbial TKO, but on the basis of the work alone, it's a triumph." The New York Times review said "In other words, even the soapier subplots of Lights Out are sparingly written and tautly filmed, and the story never strays too far from the violence that is at its core. It's an ambitious drama that doesn't lose sight of what Patrick tells a television interviewer about retirement: 'Sometimes, you miss hitting people.'" Brian Lowry at Variety said in his review "Lights Out isn't an unqualified knockout, but in its milieu, leading man and rich supporting players, score the show a clear winner on points. And that's no bull." James Poniewozik from Time said "It starts and finishes strong, and in between, it passed the most important test this non-boxing-fan could hold it to: when I finished one episode, I immediately wanted to put another in." Matthew Gilbert of The Boston Globe said "The story of Patrick 'Lights' Leary is engrossing from the first bell, with nicely developed plots and psychological twists that transcend the genre cliches of the boxing drama. And the acting is strong where it matters." Dorothy Rabinowitz from The Wall Street Journal said in her review "It's quickly clear that this skillfully sustained, sharply plotted series is a fighter saga you'll want to follow to the final bell." Ed Bark from Uncle Barky said "It sometimes lapses into the abundant cliches of its genre. Pound for pound, though, you won't see many better dramas this season. Gloves on or off, it keeps scoring points."

Lights Out drew 1.5 million viewers in its pilot episode—793,000 of them from the highly sought-after 18- to 49-year-old demographic. Viewership declined from there, however, with the series averaging 863,000 viewers per episode.

Lights Out was cancelled by FX on March 24.

References

External links 
 

2010s American drama television series
2011 American television series debuts
2011 American television series endings
American sports television series
English-language television shows
FX Networks original programming
Television series by 20th Century Fox Television
Television shows set in New Jersey
Television shows filmed in New Jersey